Dream On is an American sitcom television series created by Marta Kauffman and David Crane. It follows the family life, romantic life, and career of Martin Tupper, a divorced New York City book editor played by Brian Benben. The show distinctively interjected clips from older black-and-white television series to punctuate Tupper's feelings or thoughts. It ran for six seasons on HBO between July 8, 1990, and March 27, 1996.

Premise
The show centered on Martin Tupper's (Brian Benben) life in an apartment in New York City with his young son, and relating to his ex-wife, while trying to date other women and succeed as an editor for a small book publisher with Toby, his brassy secretary. Judith, his ex-wife, went on to marry Dr. Richard Stone – the never-seen (until the end of the series), most impossibly successful man on the planet (astronaut, brain surgeon, the fifth Beatle and consultant to the Pope); despite Martin's undying love for Judith, he could never compete with the legendary Dr. Stone.

The opening indicates Martin's mother parked him in front of the TV and he then grew up engrossed in it. It briefly shows a babysitter making out with a boyfriend behind young Martin, hence the association of sex with his memories. The show was notable for its frequent use of clips from old movies and TV shows to express Martin's inner life and feelings, which lent it much of its quirky appeal, reminding viewers about the impact of TV on their consciousness. The show was also significant for being one of the first American sitcoms to use uncensored profanity and nudity.

Cast
 Brian Benben as Martin Tupper, a book editor for a smaller publishing house that usually specializes in romance novels and other less prestigious literary fare. Having practically been raised by television in the 1950s, his thoughts are shown to the viewer through clips of classic black and white programming. He struggles to find love (or something like it) while sorting out the feelings he still has for his ex-wife, Judith.
 Wendie Malick as Judith Tupper Stone, Martin's ex-wife who has since remarried the literal perfect man, Dr. Richard Stone.
 Chris Demetral as Jeremy Tupper, Martin's teenaged son. 
 Dorien Wilson (seasons 2–6) and Jeff Joseph (season 1) as Eddie Charles, a talk show host and Martin's best friend.
 Denny Dillon as Toby Pedalbee, Martin's secretary/assistant
 Michael McKean as Gibby Fiske, Martin's boss (recurring during seasons 2–6)
 Renée Taylor as Martin's mother, Doris Tupper (occasional during seasons 3–5)

Production
The show was created by Marta Kauffman and David Crane, who also served as producers. Dream On was executive produced by Kevin Bright and John Landis. Landis also directed several episodes of the series. Dream On first aired on July 8, 1990, on HBO, and was cancelled by HBO in March 1996. One season of the show, with language and nudity edited for broadcast, aired in prime time on the Fox Broadcasting Company in 1995: Sunday at 9:30-10:00 p.m. from January to April and Monday at 9:00-10:00 p.m. from June to July. This bowdlerized version was later made available in syndication.

The static shown on the TV towards the end of the opening credits has since become part of the opening credits or introduction for every show made by HBO.

Episodes

Broadcast

Syndication
The edited version of the series aired in syndication on Comedy Central in the United States.

Reception

Critical reception
Time magazine called the show "engaging", noting that its use of old clips was "a clever gimmick [that] perks up familiar material" and later called the second season of the "decidedly adult sitcom...better than ever."

The New York Times had mixed opinions about the show.  In their first-season review, John J. O'Connor said Dream On was not "different from ordinary network fare...except for, as might be expected, the more freewheeling language and treatments of sex"; by the season's third episode, the show's protagonist is "already becoming just another nice bachelor father, not all that different from the one John Forsythe played on television several decades ago."  About a year later, O'Connor said, while the show "has its weak spots, most notably in a pointless tendency to be smarmy" with "clips... that are sometimes less witty than painfully obvious. But Dream On takes unusual chances and has a habit of turning out to be refreshingly original."

Awards and nominations

Home media
Seasons one and two were released on DVD for both regions 1 and 2; seasons three through six have not been released.

See also

 Herman's Head (1991)
 What's Alan Watching? (1989)

References

External links
 

1990 American television series debuts
1996 American television series endings
1990s American sitcoms
English-language television shows
Fox Broadcasting Company original programming
HBO original programming
Television series about Jews and Judaism
Primetime Emmy Award-winning television series
Television series about divorce
Television series by Universal Television
Television shows set in New York City
Television series created by David Crane (producer)
Television series created by Marta Kauffman